Low Moorsley is a small village just outside Hetton-le-Hole in the City of Sunderland, north east England.

It was the birthplace of serial killer, Mary Ann Cotton (1832–1873).

References

External links

Villages in Tyne and Wear